Andi Vasluianu (born 23 June 1974) is a Romanian film actor. He appeared in more than fifty films since 2000.

Selected filmography

References

External links
 

1974 births
Living people
Male actors from Bucharest
Romanian male film actors
Caragiale National University of Theatre and Film alumni